Clarkesworld Magazine (ISSN 1937-7843) is an American online fantasy and science fiction magazine. It released its first issue October 1, 2006, and has maintained a regular monthly schedule since, publishing fiction by authors such as Elizabeth Bear, Kij Johnson, Caitlin R. Kiernan, Sarah Monette, Catherynne Valente, Jeff VanderMeer and Peter Watts.

Formats
Clarkesworld Magazine is published or collected in a number of formats:
 All fiction is collected annually in print anthologies published by Wyrm Publishing
 Apps are available for Android, iPad and iPhone devices
 EPUB, Amazon Kindle, and Mobipocket ebook editions of each issue are available for purchase
 All content is available online via the magazine website
 All fiction is available in audio format via podcast or direct download
 Ebook subscriptions for the Kindle and EPUB readers
 Print issues are sold on Amazon and also available as a Patreon subscription option

History
Clarkesworld was founded in October 2006.

In May 2008, Clarkesworld began collecting its stories in annual print anthologies starting with Realms: The First Year of Clarkesworld Magazine.

In January 2020, its editor Neil Clarke withdrew a short story by Isabel Fall at Fall's request, "I Sexually Identify as an Attack Helicopter", after Fall had been harassed by people who suspected the story of trolling or transphobia.

On 20 February 2023, Clarke announced that the magazine would be temporarily closing submissions until an unspecified future date, with the reason being that too many AI-generated stories were being submitted.

Awards and recognition

Awards to magazine and editors

Other honors 

 Winner 2006 Million Writers Award for "Best New Online Magazine"
 Named SciFi.com Site of the Week: August 29, 2007

Art 

 Winner 2009 Chesley Awards for Best Magazine Cover, "Floating Fish", Mats Minnhagen (4/2008 Issue)
 Finalist 2010 Chesley Awards for Best Magazine Cover, "Brain Tower", Kazuhiko Nakamura (11/2009 Issue)
 Finalist 2011 Chesley Awards for Best Magazine Cover, "Warm", Sergio Rebolledo (01/2010 Issue)
 Finalist 2011 Chesley Awards for Best Magazine Cover, "Honeycomb", Julie Dillon (09/2010 Issue)
 Finalist 2011 Chesley Awards for Best Magazine Cover, "Soulhunter", Andrey Lazarev (11/2010 Issue)
 Winner 2013 Chesley Awards for Best Magazine Cover, "New World", Ken Barthelmey (11/2012 Issue)
 Winner 2019 Chelsey Awards for Best Magazine Cover, "Meeting", Arthur Haas (05/2018 Issue)
 Winner 2021 Chelsey Awards for Best Magazine Cover, "Ancient Stones", Francesca Resta (10/2020 Issue)

Content 

 Winner 2006  Million Writers Award for "Urchins, While Swimming" by Catherynne M. Valente (12/2006 Issue)
 Finalist 2007 WSFA Small Press Award, "The Third Bear" by Jeff VanderMeer (04/2007 Issue)
 Finalist 2007 WSFA Small Press Award, "Orm the Beautiful" by Elizabeth Bear (01/2007 Issue)
 Finalist 2010 Parsec Award for Best Speculative Fiction Story (Short Form), "The Things", Peter Watts (01/2010 Issue)

Current staff
Neil Clarke, publisher, editor-in-chief
Sean Wallace, editor, October 2006 – present
Kate Baker, Podcast Director, October 2009 – present, non-fiction editor, January 2013 – present

Former staff
Gardner Dozois, reprint editor, April 2013 – May 2018
Jeremy L.C. Jones, interviewer, September 2010 – December 2014
Jason Heller, non-fiction editor, January 2012 – December 2012
Cheryl Morgan, non-fiction editor, January 2009 – December 2011
Nick Mamatas, editor, October 2006 – July 2008
Ekaterina Sedia, interim non-fiction editor, August 2008 – December 2008

See also 

 Fantasy podcast

References

External links

Clarkesworlds Awards & Recognition List

Science fiction magazines published in the United States
Science fiction webzines
Fantasy fiction magazines
Science fiction podcasts
Fantasy podcasts
Hugo Award-winning works
Audio podcasts
Online magazines published in the United States
Magazines established in 2006
Monthly magazines published in the United States
Magazines published in New Jersey